Sir Derek Anthony Sweeting  is a British High Court judge.

Early life 
Sweeting grew up in Greater London, attending a state school and later studying law at Clare College, Cambridge.

Before undertaking his Law degree, he served in the British Army for 1 year. He trained at Royal Military Academy Sandhurst was deployed to West Germany as a Tank Commander. Upon completion of his studies in Cambridge, he enlisted as a Reservist in the Special Air Service (SAS).

Career 
Sweeting was called to the Bar in 1983 by Middle Temple and was appointed King's Counsel in 2001.

Before becoming a High Court judge, he practiced at the Barristers' chambers ‘7BR’.

Bar Council 
He was appointed as Chair of the Bar council in 2021 until 2022.

In April 2021, Sweeting questioned whether the term 'BAME' (Black, Asian, and Minority ethnic) could "disguise the fact that there's massive under-representation of black members of our community at the bar".

Judicial career 
Sweeting was appointed as a Recorder in the Crown Court and County Court on 15 March 2002.

On 11 January 2022, Sweeting was appointed as a High Court Judge. He was assigned to the King's Bench Division by the Lord Chief Justice. He has not yet received his customary Knight Bachelor.

References 

Living people
Alumni of Clare College, Cambridge
Graduates of the Royal Military Academy Sandhurst
Year of birth missing (living people)
Queen's Bench Division judges
English King's Counsel
21st-century King's Counsel